Wisconsin's 8th State Senate district is one of 33 districts of the Wisconsin State Senate.  Located in southeast Wisconsin, the district comprises northeastern Milwaukee County, southern Ozaukee County, southern Washington County, and northeastern Waukesha County.

Current elected officials
Alberta Darling was the most recent senator representing the 8th district. She was first elected in the 1992 general election and resigned in December 2022. A special election will be held in this district concurrent with the 2023 Spring election.

Each Wisconsin State Senate district is composed of three State Assembly districts.  The 8th Senate district comprises the 22nd, 23rd, and 24th Assembly districts.  The current representatives of those districts are: 
 Assembly District 22: Janel Brandtjen (R–Menomonee Falls)
 Assembly District 23: Deb Andraca (D–Whitefish Bay)
 Assembly District 24: Dan Knodl (R–Germantown)

The 8th Senate district, in its current borders, crosses three different congressional districts.  The Milwaukee County portions of the district fall within Wisconsin's 4th congressional district, represented by U.S. Representative Gwen Moore; the Washington County and Waukesha County portions of the district fall within Wisconsin's 5th congressional district, represented by U.S. Representative Scott L. Fitzgerald; and the Ozaukee County portions of the district fall within Wisconsin's 6th congressional district, represented by U.S. Representative Glenn Grothman.

Past senators
Note: the boundaries of districts have changed repeatedly over history. Previous politicians of a specific numbered district have represented a completely different geographic area, due to redistricting.

The Eighth District as originally created consisted of Green County. It was represented by:

See also

 Administrative divisions of Wisconsin

References

External links
Alberta Darling official campaign site (2008)

Wisconsin State Senate districts
Milwaukee County, Wisconsin
Ozaukee County, Wisconsin
Washington County, Wisconsin
Waukesha County, Wisconsin
1848 establishments in Wisconsin